Sanlitun Subdistrict is a subdistrict in the western side of Chaoyang District, Beijing, China. In the year 2020, it had a population of 32,347.

The name Sanlitun is based on the fact that at the time of the naming, during the Qing dynasty, it was three Chinese miles away from Dongzhimen, the nearest city gate of Beijing.

History

Administrative Division 

As of 2021, there are 7 communities under the subdistrict:

Landmark 
 Sanlitun area
 Taiguli Shopping Center  (Taikoo Li Sanlitun)

See also
List of township-level divisions of Beijing

References

Chaoyang District, Beijing
Subdistricts of Beijing